The Men's Irish Hockey League is a field hockey league organised by Hockey Ireland that features men's teams from both the Republic of Ireland and Northern Ireland. The league was first played for during the 2008–09 season. It replaced the All-Ireland Club Championships as the top level men's field hockey competition in Ireland. Since 2015–16 the league has been sponsored by Ernst & Young and, as a result, it is also known as the EY Hockey League.

History

Format
The league was first played for during the 2008–09 season.
Between 2008–09 and 2014–15 the league used pool stages and play-offs to determine the league champion. Teams were divides into two pools with the winners and runners-up in each pool then qualifying for the semi-finals. The league title was then decided by a final. Teams continued to play in their respective provincial leagues and qualified for the next season's national league via their position in the provincial league. However for the 2015–16 season the league was reorganised. The pool stages were abandoned and replaced with a full league programme consisting of 18 rounds of home and away matches. In addition the play-offs were effectively replaced by a new competition, the EY Champions Trophy. Furthermore the clubs no longer entered their senior teams in provincial leagues.

Graham Shaw guided Monkstown to three successive league titles in 2012–13, 2013–14 and 2014–15. In 2017–18 Glenanne won the league title for the first time. They secured the title after defeating Lisnagarvey 4–2. Glenanne were 2–0 down before Shane O'Donoghue scored a hat-trick.

Division 2
The 2018–19 season saw the introduction of a Division 2. The new division revived the original format of the league. It uses pool stages and play-offs to determine the Division 2 champion and which teams get promoted to Division 1. Division 2 teams will continue to play in their respective provincial leagues.

2022–23 teams

Division 1

Division 2
Pool A

Pool B

Winners

Notes

EY Champions Trophy
In addition to introducing a new format, the 2015–16 season also saw the introduction of the EY Champions Trophy. The top three placed teams from the league and/or the winners of the Irish Senior Cup all qualify for the end of season competition. The winners of the EY Champions Trophy qualify to represent Ireland in the Euro Hockey League.

References

 
 
2008 establishments in Ireland
Sports leagues established in 2008
Ire